Rabbi Judah ben Benjamin Anav (Hebrew: יהודה בן בנימין ענו or ריבב"ן; approximately 1215-1280) was one of the Rishonim in Italy. He wrote a known commentary on the main book of Isaac Alfasi, a commentary to tractate Shekalim of the Mishna and on Sheiltot by Achai Gaon. He also wrote a book about Shechita and Terefah. His cousin, Zedekiah ben Abraham Anaw, was also his student and quoted him in his book many times.

References

External links
 Anav, Judah ben Benjamin Ha-Rofe, Encyclopaedia Judaica

13th-century Italian rabbis